Cearacesaini is a tribe of crickets in the subfamily Hapithinae: found in North, Central, and South America. There are at least 4 genera and about 16 described species in Cearacesaini.

Genera
These four genera belong to the tribe Cearacesaini:
 Barota Gorochov, 2017
 Cearacesa Koçak & Kemal, 2010
 Najtaecesa Desutter-Grandcolas, 2017
 Taroba de Mello & Souza-Dias, 2010

References

Further reading

 
 

Crickets
Orthoptera tribes